Silver Lady may refer to the following:

 "Silver Lady (song)", song by David Soul 
 For the Rolls-Royce emblem see Spirit of Ecstasy
 Silver Lady (model locomotive), the model steam locomotive used on The Biggest Little Railway in the World